Alessandro Paganessi (born 31 January 1959) is an Italian former racing cyclist. He won stage 20 of the 1983 Giro d'Italia.

References

External links
 

1959 births
Living people
Italian male cyclists
Italian Giro d'Italia stage winners
Place of birth missing (living people)
People from Gazzaniga
Cyclists from the Province of Bergamo
Tour de Suisse stage winners